The Schichau class consisted of 22 torpedo boats built for the Austro-Hungarian Navy between 1885 and 1891. The class was one of the first torpedo boat classes built for the Austro-Hungarian Navy, and they were initially powered by steam from a single locomotive boiler and were armed with two  Hotchkiss guns and two  torpedo tubes. The entire class was reconstructed between 1900 and 1910, when they received two Yarrow boilers and a second funnel.

Ten of the class were converted into minesweepers between 1911 and 1913. One boat was discarded in 1911, with the rest seeing active service as part of local defence forces for the Adriatic naval bases during World War I, with one being lost in the early days of the war. The remaining ten torpedo boats were also converted to minesweepers in 1917, although five still carried torpedoes. After the war, sixteen of the boats were allocated to Italy and four were allocated to the navy of the newly created Kingdom of the Serbs, Croats and Slovenes (later Yugoslavia). Two were commissioned while the other two were used for spare parts. Except for one of the Yugoslav boats which was retained as a training vessel, all of the boats had been discarded by 1929. After capture during the April 1941 Axis invasion of Yugoslavia in World War II, the remaining boat saw service with the Italians and then the Germans. She was lost while in German hands sometime after September 1943.

Background
During the 1880s, the Austro-Hungarian Navy became aligned with the French  (Young School) of naval strategy, which advocated, among other things, the use of small but powerfully-armed ships to defeat larger capital ships of an enemy. This strategy was to some extent driven by the budgetary difficulties the navy faced after the death of the reforming  (chief naval officer)  Wilhelm von Tegetthoff. His successor,  Friedrich von Pöck, had his requests for increased funding for new ironclads repeatedly rejected in the 1870s and early 1880s, and turned to less expensive means to defend Austria-Hungary's coastline.

One of the innovations that supported the  strategy was the development of the torpedo into an effective weapon. In 1868 the Austro-Hungarian Navy had been the first to arm its ships with the new weapon, which had been invented four years earlier by the Austro-Hungarian Navy officer Johann Luppis and manufactured by the Stabilimento Tecnico di Fiume naval engineering firm in Fiume led by Robert Whitehead. The vessel developed to deliver these weapons was the torpedo boat, a small and fast vessel intended to work in conjunction with cruisers. The Austro-Hungarian adoption of the  strategy, and the development of both high seas and coastal tactics for torpedo boats, went hand-in-hand with the construction of dozens of torpedo boats for the Austro-Hungarian Navy, which began under Pöck, and continued with the construction of the Schichau class under his successor,  Maximilian Daublebsky von Sterneck.

Design and construction
The Schichau-class boats were of a flush-deck design and had a raised bridge, with a short stepped foremast positioned just forward of the bridge. A raked mainmast was located amidships; it was fitted with a derrick for raising and lowering the lifeboat. The crew consisted of 16 to 18 officers and enlisted men. All boats used a single triple-expansion engine driving one propeller shaft initially using steam generated by a locomotive boiler trunked through a single funnel positioned immediately behind the bridge. The boiler was replaced by two Yarrow boilers between 1900 and 1910, and a second funnel was installed.

The early batches of boats had both torpedo tubes bow-mounted in the hull, but the later batches had one bow-mounted tube with the second tube located in the stern. At the time they came into service, the boats were rated as first-class torpedo boats.

Boats
A total of 22 boats were built by three shipbuilding companies; Seearsenal Pola and Stabilimento Tecnico Triestino in the Austro-Hungarian Empire, and Schichau-Werke in Germany. At the time they were built, boats of this class were initially given names, but they were redesignated with numbers on 1 April 1910.

Service history
On 7 November 1893, Krähe (No. 22) collided with the torpedo cruiser  in the Hvar Channel between the islands of Brač and Hvar in the Adriatic Sea. After all boats of the class were reconstructed between 1900 and 1910, Nos. 27, 29, 30, 33–38 and 40 were converted into minesweepers between 1911 and 1913. Most of the boats converted to minesweepers no longer carried torpedoes but they did retain their guns. No. 28 was discarded by the navy in 1911, and transferred to the Austro-Hungarian Army, serving as Tender 28. At the outbreak of World War I the class was obsolete. In August 1914, the Schichau-class torpedo boats and minesweepers were split between the various local-defence forces for the main Austro-Hungarian ports on the Adriatic coast. Nos. 21, 24, 32 and 39 formed the 13th Torpedo Boat Group of the 7th Torpedo Division at Pola on the southern tip of the Istrian peninsula in the northern Adriatic, with Nos. 27, 30, 33, 34, 37 and 40 forming part of the Pola minesweeping flotilla. Nos. 20, 23 and 26 were stationed at Triesteon the coast west of the Istrian peninsulaas part of the 15th and 16th Torpedo Boat Groups. Nos. 19, 22, 25 and 31 formed the 20th Torpedo Boat Group of the 10th Torpedo Division at Sebenicoon the central Dalmatian coastalongside a minesweeping group that included Nos. 29 and 35. At Cattaro Bay (the modern-day Bay of Kotor)on the southern Dalmatian coastNos. 36 and 38 were part of the minesweeping force.

On 23 August 1914, No. 26 struck a mine off Pola when she was pushed out of the safe route through the southern minefield by a strong gale. Her captain  Josef Konic and six of the crew were rescued, but one officer and ten crew members were lost. She later returned to service. The French submarine  slipped between the protective minefields outside Cattaro Bay and entered the bay on 29 November, but she was spotted by the  57 T, which raised the alarm. Cugnot struck an underwater obstacle and cancelled the attack, and 57 T fired a torpedo at her, but the torpedo missed because the depth was set too low. Cugnot then escaped from the bay and out through the minefield gap. On 20 December, the French submarine  posed a serious threat when she entered the harbour at Pola and became tangled in anti-submarine net cables. After four hours of fruitless attempts to free herself, she surfaced and was attacked by Nos. 24 and 39, the Kaiman-class torpedo boat 63 T, the Huszár-class destroyer , the older Schichau-built destroyer , some smaller auxiliaries of the 1st Mine Command, and the "Cristo" coastal artillery battery. Curie was sunk by gunfire, but only one crew member was killed and another died of his wounds.

No. 22 ran aground and sank off Sebenico on 3 March 1916, but was salvaged and repaired later that year. All of the remaining torpedo boats were converted to minesweepers during 1917. The boats of the class all retained their torpedo tubes, but only Nos. 19 and 21–24 still carried torpedoes.  On 16 November 1917, Nos. 23, 27 and 30 were part of a minesweeping force that supported the bombardment of a  Italian shore battery at Cortellazzo near the mouth of the Piave near Venice, supported by three seaplanes. None of the torpedo boats suffered any damage. After an Italian force of three MAS boats appeared, covered by seven destroyers and three submarines, the bombarding force withdrew. On 19 December, a large Austro-Hungarian force again engaged the Italian shore battery at Cortellazzo. The force was supported by Nos. 20, 23, 27, 30, 32 and 34. None of the ships of the bombarding force suffered damage during the mission. On 5 April 1918, the Huszár-class destroyer  and No. 26 put a landing party ashore at Anconaon the central Italian coastbut the party was captured. On 5 September, Nos. 19 and 38 were supporting another torpedo boat in the Gulf of Drinoff the Albanian coastwhen they encountered an Italian force. The Austro-Hungarian boats broke off contact and escaped.

Twenty boats survived the war. Under the Treaty of Saint-Germain-en-Laye, sixteen were allocated to Italy, and she made use of five as customs vessels but scrapped the rest. The customs vessels had also been scrapped by 1925. The remaining four vessels were allocated to the new Kingdom of Serbs, Croats and Slovenes (later renamed Yugoslavia). The Yugoslavs retained Nos. 21, 36, 38 and 19 as the minesweepers D1 to D4, respectively. In Yugoslav service the guns were removed and they were armed with two machine guns. Only D1 and D2 were commissioned, with D3 and D4 laid up at the Tivat Arsenal in the Bay of Kotor and used as a source of spare parts for the two commissioned boats. The latter two were discarded in 1925 and 1927 respectively. D1 was used as a guardship and minesweeper at Kumbor and elsewhere in the Bay of Kotor until she was stricken on 5 June 1929. D2 was initially retained as a minesweeper based out of the Bay of Kotor, then employed as the training vessel for the Naval Academy at Gruž, the main port of Dubrovnikon the far southern coast of Yugoslaviabetween 1924 and 1941. While in this role, she retained only a skeleton regular navy crew, as the rest of the positions were made up with trainees. Many former Yugoslav Royal Navy personnel fondly remembered their time training aboard D2.

When the Axis invasion of Yugoslavia commenced in April 1941 as part of World War II, D2 was under the command of  Franc Podboj. The boat sailed from Gruž to the Bay of Kotor during the invasion, and was captured there by the Italians. She served in the Italian Royal Navy as D10. The boat was captured by the German Navy on 11 September 1943 in the Bay of Kotor at the time of the Italian capitulation. At the time she was of no operational value. The final boat of the class was lost in their hands off Kumbor sometime thereafter, or scuttled by them in the Bay of Kotor as they withdrew.

Notes

Footnotes

References

Books

Journals

 
 
 

Ships built in Pola
Ships built in Trieste
Torpedo boats of the Austro-Hungarian Navy
World War I torpedo boats of Austria-Hungary
Torpedo boats of the Royal Yugoslav Navy
Naval ships of Yugoslavia captured by Italy during World War II
Naval ships of Italy captured by Germany during World War II